Whisper Not is a live album by American pianist Keith Jarrett's "Standards Trio" featuring Gary Peacock and Jack DeJohnette recorded in concert in July 1999 at the Palais Des Congrès in Paris, France and released by ECM Records in October 2000.

Reception

The AllMusic review by Richard S. Ginell awarded the album 4½ stars and states, "even those who think they have enough material by this group will be rightly tempted to invest in this document of Jarrett's resurrection".

The authors of The Penguin Guide to Jazz wrote: "this was a celebratory occasion... one of the first times when Jarrett seemed clear of the chronic fatigue that had afflicted him over the previous two years... one is struck more by the renewed interest in bebop than concerned that there seems to be a slight, almost subliminal dulling of his articulation and phrasing... Peacock and DeJohnette are both in magisterial form... Our nominations for immortality from this set would be 'What Is This Thing Called Love?' and a magnificent 'Poinciana'."

Writing for DownBeat, Ted Panken commented: "the pianist makes a Steinway dance buoyantly through 14 canonical tunes, conjuring free-as-the-wind melodies with effortless grace. The animating imperative here is the syntax of bebop... Unencumbered by iconic interpretations of the now vernacularized repertoire, Jarrett, Peacock and DeJohnette impart to their statements the improvising-from-point-zero approach that is their trademark; they avoid cliché while retaining idiomatic nuances of phrasing and swing that define the form and make it live. All in all, a stimulating paean to the rejuvenating powers of improvisation by one of the supreme communicators in jazz."

Gary Giddins remarked: "When Jarrett, Peacock, and Jack DeJohnette lift off at medium-up tempos, they create their own orbit. 'Bouncing with Bud,' 'Groovin’ High,' and 'What Is This Thing Called Love?' are spectacular, as are the encores."

Track listing
 "Bouncing with Bud" (Bud Powell) - 7:33  
 "Whisper Not" (Benny Golson) - 8:06  
 "Groovin' High" (Dizzy Gillespie) - 8:31  
 "Chelsea Bridge" (Billy Strayhorn) - 9:47  
 "Wrap Your Troubles in Dreams (and Dream Your Troubles Away)" (Harry Barris, Ted Koehler, Billy Moll) - 5:48  
 "'Round Midnight" (Thelonious Monk) - 6:45  
 "Sandu" (Clifford Brown) - 7:26  
 "What Is This Thing Called Love?" (Cole Porter) - 12:24  
 "Conception" (George Shearing) - 8:08  
 "Prelude to a Kiss" (Duke Ellington, Irving Gordon, Irving Mills) - 8:16 
 "Hallucinations" (Powell) - 6:36  
 "All My Tomorrows" (Sammy Cahn, Jimmy Van Heusen) - 6:23  
 "Poinciana" (Nat Simon, Buddy Bernier) - 9:11  
 "When I Fall in Love" (Edward Heyman, Victor Young) - 8:06

Personnel 
 Keith Jarrett – piano
 Gary Peacock - bass
 Jack DeJohnette - drums

Production
 Manfred Eicher - producer
 Martin Pearson - engineer (recording)
 Sascha Kleis - design

References 

Gary Peacock live albums
Jack DeJohnette live albums
Standards Trio albums
Keith Jarrett live albums
1999 live albums
ECM Records live albums
Albums produced by Manfred Eicher